Rabbi Eliyahu Baal Shem or Elijah Baal Shem may refer to:
Rabbi Elijah Ba'al Shem of Chelm (born 1550)
Rabbi Elijah Loans (born at Frankfurt-am-Main, 1555; died at Worms, 1636)